Romain Arneodo and Andrei Vasilevski were the defending champions but chose not to defend their title.

Treat Huey and Nathaniel Lammons won the title after defeating Luke Saville and John-Patrick Smith 7–5, 6–2 in the final.

Seeds

Draw

References

External links
 Main draw

Cleveland Open - Doubles
Cleveland Open